Øystein Rian (born 23 February 1945, in Lillehammer) is a Norwegian historian who specializes in the history of Denmark-Norway from 1536 to 1814, particularly its political, social and religious history.

He was appointed associate professor at Telemark University College in 1977, and was a professor at the University of Oslo from 1993 until reaching the emeritus age in 2015. He is a member of the Norwegian Academy of Science and Letters.

He is the younger brother of Erlend Rian. Rian is openly gay.

Selected bibliography
, 1975
, 1980
, volume 5 of Aschehougs Norgeshistorie, 1995
, 1997
, volume 2 of Danmark-Norge 1380-1814, 1997
, 2003
, 2003
, 2007

References
University of Oslo
List of publications in FRIDA

1945 births
Living people
People from Lillehammer
20th-century Norwegian historians
Academic staff of Telemark University College
Academic staff of the University of Oslo
Members of the Norwegian Academy of Science and Letters
Norwegian gay writers
Historians of LGBT topics
LGBT historians
Royal Norwegian Society of Sciences and Letters
21st-century Norwegian historians